Carex glaucescens is a perennial sedge that belongs to the family Cyperaceae. The common name of this sedge is the southern waxy sedge due to the blue-grey, waxy appearance of the sheaths and fruits. The term "glaucous" means "gleaming" or "grey" in Latin; the specific epithet of C. glaucescens is derived from this term. Carex glaucescens is a native plant in North America and is an obligate wetland species in the Atlantic and Gulf Coastal Plains, Eastern Mountains and Piedmont, and the Great Plains.

Description

Carex glaucescens is a graminoid, meaning they have a grass-like appearance. This species begins blooming in the early summer months, and begins developing fruits into the late summer months around July and August. Carex glaucescens features a staminate spikelete at the top of the plant which fertilizes the pistillate spikelets below it. The fruits are born on pendulous pistillate spikelets which are covered by translucent papilla, which gives the fruit sac its glaucous appearance. Inside the fruit sac are ellipsoid achenes, the seed of the plant.

References

glaucescens